The districts of Lesotho are further divided into constituencies, which are in turn divided into community councils.

Functions
Functions of a community council:

Community councils by district

Berea District

Butha-Buthe District

Leribe District

Mafeteng District

Maseru District

Mohale's Hoek District

Mokhotlong District

Qacha's Nek District

Quthing District

Thaba-Tseka District

 Bokong
 Lesobeng
 Khutlo-Se-Metsi
 Litsoetse
 Linakeng
 Urban Council

References

Subdivisions of Lesotho
Lesotho geography-related lists
Lesotho, Community councils
Lesotho 3
Lesotho politics-related lists